Born Lion are an Australian band based in Sydney that formed in 2012. Their Final Words album was nominated for a 2015 ARIA Award for Best Hard Rock/Heavy Metal Album. Their album Celebrate the Lie was released in early 2018.

Born Lion signed to FOUR FOUR, an imprint of ABC Music, in March 2015.

Band members
 John Bowker
 Red
 Nathan Mulholland
 Andres Hyde

Discography

Albums

Extended Plays

Awards and nominations

ARIA Music Awards
The ARIA Music Awards are a set of annual ceremonies presented by Australian Recording Industry Association (ARIA), which recognise excellence, innovation, and achievement across all genres of the music of Australia. They commenced in 1987. 

! 
|-
| 2015 || Final Words || ARIA Award for Best Hard Rock or Heavy Metal Album ||  ||

References

Musical groups from Sydney